"C'mere" is a song by American rock band Interpol and is featured on the band's second studio album, Antics (2004). It was released 11 April 2005 as the third single from that album, charting at number 19 on the UK Singles Chart (see 2005 in music).

The song was played many times at their live shows before the release of Antics, and has gone under the name "Strangers in the Night", which had some melodic and lyrical changes between different versions.

The music video for "C'mere" was directed by Associates in Science.

Track listings

7": Matador / OLE6647 (UK)
"C'mere" – 3:12
"Not Even Jail" (remix) – 5:39

7": Matador / OLE6657 (UK)
"C'mere" – 3:12
"Narc" (Paul Banks remix) – 2:37

CD: Matador / OLE6642 (UK)
"C'mere" – 3:12
"Public Pervert" (Carlos D remix) – 8:08
"Length of Love" (Fog vs. Mould remix) – 7:47

CD: EMI / 3126172 (France)
"C'mere" – 3:12
"Narc" (Paul Banks remix) – 2:37
"Length of Love" (Fog vs. Mould remix) – 7:47
"Public Pervert" (Carlos D remix) – 8:08
"Not Even Jail" (Daniel Kessler remix) – 5:39

Charts

References

Interpol (band) songs
2005 singles
2004 songs
Matador Records singles
UK Independent Singles Chart number-one singles
Songs written by Carlos Dengler
Songs written by Paul Banks (American musician)
Songs written by Sam Fogarino
Songs written by Daniel Kessler (guitarist)